The George Inn may refer to:

 The George Inn, Derby, a Grade II listed building
 The George Inn, Norton St Philip, a Grade I listed building
 The George Inn, Southwark, a public house established in the medieval period
 The George Inn, Grantham, Grantham, a public house built in 1780
 The George Inn, Portland, Isle of Portland, Dorset, England

See also
 George Washington Inn, Washington